Thijs van der Meulen (born 17 December 1980) is a Dutch footballer who plays for Topklasse club FC Hilversum as a defender. He started his career at FC Den Bosch, where he made his debut against FC Twente in 2004. However, he did not play any more games for Den Bosch and moved on to play football for a number of amateur sides. He currently plays for FC Hilversum.

References

1980 births
Living people
Dutch footballers
FC Den Bosch players
Kozakken Boys players
Derde Divisie players
Eredivisie players
Association football defenders
Footballers from Amsterdam
FC Hilversum players